Simran (Gurmukhi: ਸਿਮਰਨ,; ; from Sanskrit: , smaraṇa, 'to remember, reminisce, recollect'), in spirituality, is a Sanskrit word referring to the continuous remembrance of the finest aspect of the self, and/or the continuous remembrance (or feeling) of God. This state is maintained continuously while carrying out the worldly works outside.

Sikhism 
Simran—commonly used as a verb in Gurmukhi—refers to 'meditating' on the name (nām) of God. Sikhism is a distinct faith, whereby God can be realized purely through individual devotion, without subjection to rites and rituals by priests or other intermediaries.

According to the Guru Granth Sahib, through simran, one is purified and attains salvation (mukti). This is because si-mar means 'to die over', thus indicating the death of ego, allowing the realization of ultimate truth (sach) to appear.

On page 202 of the Guru Granth Sahib:

This hymn teaches that a person who wishes to gain from this human life must attain a higher spiritual state by becoming free of attachment by realizing emptiness of worldly phenomena. Thereby, merit is acquired by devoutly repeating, comprehending, and living by the sacred word every day so as to progressively reveal the divine and ultimate truth to the person who earnestly seeks it:

Guru Ram Das says in Sarang ki var (Guru Granth Sahib, 1242):

Sant Mat 
In Sant Mat, the word simran is used for the spiritual practice of repeating the mantra given by the Satguru during initiation. The mantra itself is also called Simran. Simran repetition is done during meditation and also outside it, however this mantra is later dropped in favor of real feeling of self or the God, which happens due to breaking out of monotony through Jap. Thus mantra is used only until the point, monotony and previously formed patterns are broken. After it pure Simran is carried by the sadhak.

See also 
 Vipassanā 
 Dhyana 
 Dhyana in Hinduism

References 

Spirituality
Meditation
Sikh practices
Sant Mat
Hindu practices